Peter Thomas Smedvig (born August 1946), is a Norwegian billionaire businessman, the founder of Smedvig Capital, and the chairman of Smedvig ASA, which was founded by his grandfather, Peder Smedvig.

Early life
Peter Thomas Smedvig was born in Stavanger in August 1946. He has received a bachelor's degree from the Newcastle University in 1970, and an MBA from the Wharton School of Finance and Commerce, University of Pennsylvania in 1972.

Career
In 1996, he co-founded Smedvig Capital with Johnny Hewett.

He is the principal owner of Smedvig ASA and Scana Industrier ASA.

Personal life 
His daughter is Anna Margaret Smedvig.

References

1946 births
Norwegian billionaires
Norwegian businesspeople in shipping
Alumni of Newcastle University
Wharton School of the University of Pennsylvania alumni
Living people
Smedvig family